David Anthony Edward Scaife (born 16 December 1988) is an Australian politician, who was elected as a Labor member for Cockburn in the Western Australian Legislative Assembly at the 2021 state election.

Early life and education
David Scaife was born on 16 December 1988 in Subiaco, Western Australia to Roy Edward Walter Scaife, a public servant, and Catherine Mary Scaife (née Rowe). He went to Australind Primary School from 1993 to 2000, and Australind Senior High School from 2001 to 2005. He was one of 23 students in 2005 to achieve a perfect Tertiary Entrance Rank score of 99.95. He studied for a Bachelor of Arts (Hons) at the University of Western Australia from 2006 to 2012, and a Master of Laws at University College London in 2019 and 2020.

Politics
Scaife joined the Australian Labor Party (WA) in 2005. He joined the Australian Manufacturing Workers Union in 2008, making him part of the Labor Left faction. He worked in the office of Senator Louise Pratt from August 2008 to November 2012. After that, he worked for the Australian Manufacturing Workers' Union until March 2013. He was president of WA Young Labor in 2012.

From August 2013 to August 2016, he worked as a lawyer for Slater and Gordon Lawyers. From August 2016 until March 2017, he worked as a legal practise director for Eureka Lawyers.

Scaife contested the electoral district of Murray-Wellington for Labor in 2013, but lost. He later contested the electoral district of Cockburn for Labor at the 2021 state election, after its incumbent Labor member Fran Logan retired. He comfortably won the safe Labor seat, with 68.2% of the primary vote.

Personal life
Scaife grew up in regional Western Australia and is married to Ellie Whiteaker, the Assistant State Secretary of WA Labor. He currently lives in Yangebup.

References

1988 births
Living people
Australian Labor Party members of the Parliament of Western Australia
Labor Left politicians
Members of the Western Australian Legislative Assembly
21st-century Australian politicians
University of Western Australia alumni
Alumni of University College London